Bryan Herta Autosport is an American auto racing team that competes in the IndyCar Series and the Michelin Pilot Challenge. It is owned by former IndyCar driver Bryan Herta. The team won the 2011 Indianapolis 500 with driver Dan Wheldon.

In 2016, Herta's entry was merged into the Andretti Autosport organization, with Alexander Rossi driving the team's No. 98 car for Andretti Herta Autosport with Curb-Agajanian. The team, collaborating with Andretti Autosport won the 2016 Indianapolis 500. In 2018, Rossi moved to the main Andretti Autosport team and Marco Andretti switched from the main Andretti team to the Herta-assisted entry. In 2019, Marco Andretti became a part-owner of this entry, forming Andretti Herta Autosport w/ Marco Andretti & Curb-Agajanian.
 
The team competed as Bryan Herta Rallysport in the Red Bull Global RallyCross Championship from 2015 until the series folded at the end of 2017. In 2019, the team, as Bryan Herta Autosport with Curb-Agajanian, joined the Michelin Pilot Challenge in the TCR class. The team ran the Hyundai Veloster N TCR in its inaugural season in the series and drivers Michael Lewis and Mark Wilkins won the TCR championship.

IndyCar

Debut season

The team's first season of competition was in 2009 with North Carolina native Daniel Herrington, driving car #28. Through most of the season, 5th place at St. Petersburg was his best result, but Herrington changed that when he won his – and the team's – first Indy Lights race at Chicagoland. The team fielded a second car for A1GP Team Brazil's Felipe Guimarães in three mid-season road course events. Driving car number 29, Guimarães finished 3rd, 4th, and 2nd respectively at Watkins Glen, Mid-Ohio, and Sonoma. Herrington finished 7th in points after 12 Top 10s in the 15-race season, and Guimarães was 23rd overall despite competing only 3 times.

Two-car team

For 2010 they ran full-time Indy Lights programs for second-year drivers Sebastián Saavedra and Stefan Wilson. Despite ranking 5th in the championship, Saavedra quit the team after qualifying 12th for the Drive Smart Buckle Up 100 at Kentucky in September. He was replaced by BHA's 2009 driver Daniel Herrington for the race, in which he finished 12th. Saavedra had won at Iowa in June and posted 5 Top 5s and 7 Top 10s. The team's other driver, Stefan Wilson, scored 3 Top 5s and 8 Top 10s – including a season and career best of 3rd on the wet streets of St. Petersburg, Florida – but had to miss the road race at Infineon Raceway in favor of American Joel Miller while sponsorship issues were resolved. He also had to give way to 2008 Freedom 100 winner Dillon Battistini at Homestead. Each substitute driver finished 9th in his respective race. Saavedra and Wilson, each of whom missed two races, finished 8th and 11th in the championship respectively. In a season that had shorter fields than in recent years, BHA's late-season replacement drivers Herrington, Battistini, and Miller – with 2 starts each – ranked 21st, 22nd, and 23rd in that order.

Bump Day miracle
The team also qualified for the 2010 Indianapolis 500. Saavedra crashed in Turn 1 with just over an hour left on Bump Day in hopes of improving from the bubble position (33rd). At about 5:30 Saavedra was bumped by Tony Kanaan. Soon after, rookie Mario Romancini withdrew his time and improved – his Conquest Racing team were bumped in 2009 when the track became quicker – prompting Paul Tracy and rookie Jay Howard to follow suit. Conversely, Howard and Tracy failed to improve their efforts and their new speeds were slower than that of Saavedra, whose speed was never withdrawn, and was being checked for possible injury at nearby Methodist Hospital when he learned he had qualified. Born on June 2, 1990, Saavedra became the first IndyCar starter born in the 1990s. Team owner Herta jokingly referred to his low budget Indy 500 effort as "'Two Men in a Truck' Racing". His IndyCar debut ended 100 miles early in an accident in the South chute. Curt Cavin of The Indianapolis Star reported that several other IndyCar races were possible for the team in 2010, but nothing materialised.

2011

On March 21, BHA announced their signing of Angolan driver Duarte Ferreira, the first Angolan driver in Indy Lights history, to drive car number 28. The team announced their 2011 IndyCar Series season plans on March 25. 2005 Indianapolis 500 winner and season Champion Dan Wheldon, who was a teammate of Herta at Andretti-Green Racing from 2003 to 2005, won the 2011 Indianapolis 500 for the team. It was announced that the team may run additional IndyCar races in 2011. At the final race of the season at Las Vegas Motor Speedway, Wheldon was killed in an accident involving 15 drivers driving for Sam Schmidt Motorsports, which red flagged and ultimately canceled the race. BHA fielded regular Sam Schmidt Motorsports driver Alex Tagliani for the season finale in the No. 98 car who was not involved in the incident.

The car Wheldon drove in the Indianapolis 500 had been crashed at the Firestone Twin 275s Race 1 by Wade Cunningham, and was not used the rest of the season; that car was returned to the 2011 Indianapolis 500 winning livery and fully restored, with it taking a ceremonial lap at the 2012 Indianapolis 500 along with Wheldon's 2005 winning car, owned by Andretti Autosport.

Duarte Ferreira finished eighth in the final Indy Lights points with a best finish of third at the New Hampshire Motor Speedway. The team also fielded a second entry for Bruno Andrade in five road and street course races. Andrade had a best finish of fourth at Baltimore and finished 17th in points.

2012–2013
Alex Tagliani continued his association with the team, now sponsored by Barracuda Networks, with the team rebranded as Barracuda Racing. Due to a lack of pace from the Lotus engine, BHA cancelled its contract and switched to Honda, and the team chose to skip travelling to Brazil to prepare for the Indy 500. The engine switch improved the team's performance significantly: Tagliani qualified on the pole for the Firestone 550 at Texas Motor Speedway and advanced to the Firestone Fast Six – the final round of road course qualifying – in Belle Isle, Toronto, Edmonton and Mid-Ohio. Tagliani finished 17th in points with a best finish of fifth at the Edmonton Indy where he led the most laps.

BHA, then using the name Barracuda Racing, returned for the 2013 IndyCar Series season with Tagliani driving and Honda power. Tagliani was relieved of driving duties after thirteen races and replaced by Luca Filippi and J. R. Hildebrand, who had also been let go from Panther Racing earlier in the season. In 2013 the team also fielded an Indy Lights car for Chase Austin in the Freedom 100 and Axcil Jefferies at Mid-Ohio and Houston.

2014
In 2014, the team lost Barracuda Networks as a full season sponsor. Despite testing Filippi, the team chose 2012 Star Mazda champion Jack Hawksworth Hawksworth qualified second at the Grand Prix of Indianapolis, where he achieved his first top-ten finish in his IndyCar Series career, finishing seventh. He then went on to earn his first podium during the second race at the Grand Prix of Houston, finishing third. Hawksworth finished the 2014 season seventeenth in the championship points.

2015
In 2015, the team hired reigning Indy Lights champion Gabby Chaves and had full-season sponsorship from Bowers & Wilkins. Chaves had two top-ten finishes throughout the season and finished sixteenth in his first Indianapolis 500 race. Chaves was awarded the Indiana Dairy Farmers "Fastest Rookie" for having the quickest average qualifying speed for the Indianapolis 500. He was also awarded the Indy 500 Rookie of the Year honors, as well as the Sunoco Rookie of the Year for the IndyCar Series championship standings. Chaves also finished second in the TAG Heuer "Don't Crack Under Pressure" award, given to the driver who gained the most cumulative spots from qualifying to finish over the season; Chaves finished ahead of his qualifying position in every race but one, and took the checkered flag at every race except the ABC Supply 500 at Pocono Raceway, where he led 31 laps – the only laps he led in the 2015 season – but he was forced to retire 3 laps early with mechanical issues, while he was in the lead.

2016

Having fallen to insolvency, lack of adequate funding or a sufficiently well-heeled pay driver, Herta's entry was merged into the Andretti Autosport organization, with Alexander Rossi driving the team's No. 98 car.

Global RallyCross Championship
On April 16, 2015, the team announced their intention to field a team in the Global RallyCross Championship (GRC) under the name Bryan Herta Rallysport. The following day, GRC veteran rally driver Patrik Sandell and former NASCAR K&N Pro Series West driver Austin Dyne were hired to race for the team, driving the No. 18 Kobalt Tools and No. 14 Castrol Magnatec GTX cars respectively. Collete Davis was also announced to drive a GRC Lites entry for River Racing, falling under the Bryan Herta Rallysport umbrella. In August 2015, CUTTWOOD Vaping Juice made its debut on Dyne's car as the new primary sponsor for the remainder of the 2015 season.

Sandell and Dyne scored five podium finishes between them during the 2015 season; Sandell took four podium finishes in five races, including a victory at Detroit, en route to eighth in the drivers' championship. Dyne took a second-place finish at Daytona, as he finished behind Sandell in the standings, in ninth place.

Racing results

Complete IndyCar results
(key)

 The final race at Las Vegas was canceled due to Dan Wheldon's death.
 In conjunction with Andretti Autosport.
 In conjunction with Andretti Autosport and Marco Andretti.

Infiniti Pro Series/Indy Pro Series/Indy Lights
(key)

Complete Global Rallycross Championship results
(key)

Supercar

References

External links
 
 IndyCar Team Page

American auto racing teams
IndyCar Series teams
Indy Lights teams
Global RallyCross Championship teams
Auto racing teams established in 2009